The protected areas of Guinea-Bissau include national parks, natural parks, faunal reserves, forest reserves, natural monuments, and marine protected areas.

National parks
 Boé National Park
 Cantanhez Forest National Park
 Cufada National Park
 Dulombi National Park
 Orango National Park
 Varela National Park

Marine national parks
 João Vieira and Poilão Marine National Park

Biosphere reserves
 Bijagos Archipelago

Natural parks
 Rio Cacheu Mangroves Natural Park
 Lagoas de Cufada Natural Park

Faunal reserves
 Pelundo Faunal Reserve
 Canjambari Faunal Reserve

Forest reserves
 Dungal Forest Reserve
 Sumbundo Forest Reserve
 Canquelifa Forest Reserve
 Mansoa Forest Reserve
 Salifo Forest Reserve

Natural monuments
 Cusselinta Rapids
 Rochas de Nhampassare
 Muralha de Canjadude
 Gruta sagrada de Cabuca
 Fonte de agua quente de Cofra

Protected areas
 Rio Grande de Buba

Marine community protected areas
 Ilhas Formosa, Nago & Tchediã

References

 
Guinea-Bissau
protected areas